1963 European Rowing Championships may refer to:

1963 European Rowing Championships (men), the competition for men held in Copenhagen, Denmark
1963 European Rowing Championships (women), the competition for women held in Khimki near Moscow in the Soviet Union